Sergey Levonovich Kochkanyan (born 5 May 2003) is an Armenian footballer who plays as a defender for PFC Dynamo Stavropol. Born in Russia, he plays for the Armenia U21s.

Club career
He made his debut in the Russian Premier League for FC Rostov on 19 June 2020 in a game against PFC Sochi. FC Rostov was forced to field their under-18 squad in that game, as their main squad was quarantined after six players tested positive for COVID-19.

References

External links
 
 
 

2003 births
Living people
Armenian footballers
Armenia under-21 international footballers
Russian footballers
Russian people of Armenian descent
Association football defenders
FC Rostov players
FC Dynamo Stavropol players
Russian Premier League players
Russian Second League players